Al Hilal Sports Club, known as Al Hilal S.C or simply Al Hilal, is a Sudanese professional football club based in Omdurman that competes in the Sudan Premier League.

Name and history
The name Hilāl is the Arabic word for crescent – a name chosen on a night when the crescent of the moon was visible in Omdurman. Also it is the first club in the world to be named (AL- HILAL).

First Administration
 Babeker Ahmed Gabani, (F) President
 Yousef Almamoun,(F) Secretary
   Abdelraheem Sarour Kabshour,(F) Deputy Secretary
 Hamadnaallah Ahmed, (F) Financial Secretary 
 Yousef Mustafa Altiney, (F) Culture and publishing 
 Amin Babeker, (F) Captain 
 Arabi Belal, (F) Administration Member
 Fathallah Bushara, (F) Administration Member
 Babeker Mukhtar Tatay,  (F) Administration Member
 Muhamed Husein Sharfi, (F) Administration Member 
 Awad Abuzeid, (F) Administration Member 

First Squad (1930)
 Ali Abdallah Mabrouk, (F), GK
 Abdelraheem Sarour Kabshour, (F), DF
   Fathallah Bushara, (F), DF
 Hamadnaallah Ahmed, (F), DF
 Nemer Alamin, (F), DF
 Adam Rajab, (F), DF
 Awad Abuzeid, (F), MF
 Amin Babeker, (F), MF and Captain
 Muhamed Husein Sharfi, (F), MF
 Babeker Mukhtar Tatay, (F), FW
 Yousef Mustafa Altiney, (F), FW
 Muhamed Talat Farid, FWOther Founders Altejani Amer, (F) Muhamed Mustafa Abdelwahed, (F) Abdelrahman Shadad, (F) Abdallah Alsanousi, (F) Alyasa Khalifa, (F)(F) = denotes Founder

Presidential history

 Babiker Ahmed Gabani (1930)
 Amin Babiker (1930–1931)
 Hamadnaallah Ahmed (1931–1933)
 Makki Osman Azreg (1933–1938)
 Bushra Abdelrahman Sagheer (1938–1944)
 Elhaj Awadallah (1944–1946)
 Mohamed Hussaein Sharfi (1946–1948)
 Mohamed Khalid Hassan (1948–1950)
 Ahmed Mohamed Ali Elsenjawi (1950–1952)
 Mohamed Aamir Bashir Forawi (1952–1962)
 Mahmoud Abusamra (1962–1963)
 Mahjoub Taha (1963–1965)
 Elsir Mohamed Ahmed (1965–1967)
 Mohamed Abdallah Galnder (1967–1969)
 Salih Mohamed Salih (1969–1971)
 Omer Ali Hassan (1971–1973)
 Ahmed Abdelrahman Elsheikh (1973–1975)
 Zainelabdeen Mohamed Ahmed Abdelgadir (1975–1977)
 Eltayeb Abdallah Mohamed Ali (1977-84/1988/1988-91/1994-96/1999)
 Omer Mohamed Saeed (1984–1988)
 Noureldin Elmubark (1988)
 Abdelmajeed Mansour Abdallah (1991–1994)
 Hassan Abdelgadir Hilal (1996–1999)
 Taha Ali Elbashir (1999–2002)
 Abdelrahman Sirelkhatim (2002–2005)
 Salaheldin Ahmed Mohamed Idris (2005–2010)
 Yusuf Ahmed Yusuf (2010)
 Elamin Elberair (2011–2013)
 Elhaj Ataaelmanan (2013)
 Ashraf Seed Ahmed (2014–2020)
 Hesham Hassan Al Subat (2020–)

Managerial history
 Saleh Rajab (1950–1958)
 Jiří Starosta (1958–1966) (1968–1970)
 Osman Hussein Al Sabi (1966–1968)
 Al Hadi Seyam (1970–1973)
 Mustafa Shawish (1973–1975)
 Ibrahim Yahia El-Kawarty (1975–1977)
 Nasr El-Din Abbas (1977) (1982–1983)
 Muhieldin Osman (1978–1982)
 Naghwira (1983–1986)
 Ahmad Abdallah (1986–1987) (1991–1992)
 Kamal Shaddad (1987)
 Jafar Abdelrazig (1992–1993)
 Anwar Jassam (1994) (2002)
 Paulo Matta (1995–1996)
 Fawzi Al Mardi (1996–1999)
 Markinous (1999–2000)
 Ahmed Adam "Aafia" (2000–2001)
 Mustafa Younes (2002–2003)
 Branko Tucak (2003–2004)
 Sofiane Al Haydosi (2004–2005)
 Heron Ricardo Ferreira (2005–2008)
 Mohamed Muhieldin Al Diba (2008) (2017)
 José Dutra dos Santos (2009)
 Paulo Campos (2009–2010) (2014)
 Milutin Sredojević (2011)
 Diego Garzitto (2012–2013)
 Al Fateh Al Nager (2013) (2020)
 Salah Mohamed Adam (2013)
 Nasreddine Nabi (2014)
 Patrick Aussems (2015)
 Nabil Kouki (2015) (2017) (2019)
 Jean-Michel Cavalli (2016)
 Tarek El-Ashry (2016)
 Ilie Balaci (2016)
 Denis Lavagne (2017)
 Khaled Bakhit (2017)(2022-)
 Mohamed Al Fateh Hejazi (2017)
 Sergio Farias (2018)
 Mohamed Al Tayeb (2018)
 Irad Zaafouri (2018) (2018–2019)
 Lamine N'Diaye (2018)
 Haitham Mustafa (2019)
 Hamada Sedki (2019–2020)
 Zoran Manojlović (2020–2021)
 Ricardo Formosinho (2021)
 João Mota (2021–2022)
 Florent Ibengé (2022-)

Captain history1930-1967 by election1968- in seniority 1-  Amin Babeker (1930)
 2-  Muhammed Hussein Sharfi (1930–1933)
 3-  Hasan Mabrouk (1933–1935)
 4-  Abdel Aal Hussein (1935–1938)
 5-  Hashem Deifallah (1938–1942)
 6-  Abdel Kheir Saleh (1942–1946) (1953–1956)
 7-  Saleh Rajab (1946–1947)
 8- Yousef Abdel Azeez (1947–1948)
 9-  Awad Ahmed (1948–1949)
 10-  Muhamed Talat Farid (1949–1950)
 11-  Alnour Balla (1950–1952)
 12-  Zaki Saleh (1956–1957)
 13-  Siddiq Manzul (1957–1963)
 14-  Deim El-Kabir (1963–1964)
 15-  Sabit Dudu (1965–1967)
 16-  Ebrahim Alkawarti (1968–1969)
 17-  Amin Zaki (1970–1971)
 18-  Deim El-Sagheer(1972–1974)
 19-  Nasreldin Jaksa (1975–1977)
 20-  Ali Gagarin (1978–1979)
 21-  Ezzeldin Al-dehish(1978–1979)
 22-  Gasim Ahmed Osman (1979-1980)
 23-  Abdallah Musa (1981-1982)
 24-  Salah Abu Rouf (1983)
 25-  Mustafa Elnager (1984–1985)
 26-  Mustafa Seimawi (1986)
 27-  Tareg Ahmed Adam (1987–1993)
 28-  Mansour Tenga (1994–1997)
 29-  Jamal Al-Thalab (1997)
 30-  Akef Ataa (1998)
 31-  Mustafa Komi (1999)
 32-  Muhamed Hamdan (2000–2001)
 33-  Hemed Kamal (2002–2003)
 34-  Haitham Mustafa (2004–2012)
 35-  Omer Bakhit (2013–2014)
 36-  Seif Mesawi (2015–2016)
 37-  Mudathir Karika (2017–2018)
 38-  Muhamed Besha (2018–2019)
 39-  Abdellatif Boya (2019–2022)
 40-  Muhamed Abdel Rahman (2022–)

Honours

National titlesSudan Premier League: 29Champion: 1965, 1967, 1970, 1973, 1981, 1983, 1984, 1986, 1987, 1989, 1991, 1994, 1995, 1996, 1998, 1999, 2003, 2004, 2005, 2006, 2007, 2009, 2010, 2012, 2014, 2016, 2017, 2020–21, 2021–22 (Record)Sudan Cup: 8Champion: 1998, 2000, 2002, 2004, 2009, 2011, 2016, 2021–22

African titles
 CAF Champions LeagueRunner-up: (2) 1987, 1992

Arab titles
 Arab Cup Winners' CupRunner-up: (1) 2002

Performance in CAF competitions
CAF Champions LeagueCAF Champions League: 36 appearancesTop scorers in CAF Champions League

CAF Confederation CupCAF Confederation Cup: 6 appearancesTop scorers in CAF Confederation Cup

African Cup Winners' CupAfrican Cup Winners' Cup : 4 appearancesCAF CupCAF Cup: 2 appearancesPerformance in UAFA competitions
Arab Champions LeagueArab Club Champions Cup : 11 appearancesTop scorers in Arab Club Champions Cup

Arab Cup Winners' CupArab Cup Winners' Cup:2 appearancesTop scorers in Arab Cup Winners' Cup

Performance in Cecafa Clubs competitions
CECAFA Clubs CupCECAFA Clubs Cup:8 appearances'Top scorers in Kagame Interclub Cup

Motto
The motto for Al-Hilal is Allah – AlWatan – Al-Hilal''. It is translated to English as "God – The Nation – Al-Hilal", which establishes a priority love list for Al-Hilal fans.

Players

Out on loan

 (on loan) Naft Maysan SC (Until June 2023)
 (on loan) Haidoub SC (Until June 2023)

References

External links
 Official website 

 
Hilal
Association football clubs established in 1930
Omdurman
1930 establishments in Sudan